Nyunt Win (8 March 1941 – 1 July 2021) was a Burmese film actor. He won seven Myanmar Motion Picture Academy Awards throughout his distinguished career, the most of any recipient in Burmese history.

Nyunt Win's father Shwe Man Tin Maung founded a theater troupe, Shwe Man Thabin, in 1933.

Filmography
Hsaung (1966)
Ko Yal Toe Yal Soe Soe Yal (1967)
Banto Lu Lay Nae Thuzar (1968)
Apeyadana (1968)
Chit Thu Waing Waing Lal (1971)
Aww Main Ma Main Ma (1972)
Tatiya A Ywal Ei Dutiya Waydanar (1983)
Thida Khun Hna Tan (1993)
Never Shall We Be Enslaved (1997)
Hsan Yay (2002)
Mystery of Snow (2004)
Kyan Sit Min (2005)
Zaw Ka Ka Nay The (2009)
Htarwara A Linn Tan Myar (2011)

Awards and nominations

References

External links

1940 births
2021 deaths
20th-century Burmese male actors
People from Yangon
Burmese male film actors
20th-century Burmese male singers